Eujuriniodes is a genus of parasitic flies in the family Tachinidae. There are at least two described species in Eujuriniodes.

Species
These two species belong to the genus Eujuriniodes:
 Eujuriniodes assimilis (Van Der Wulp, 1892)
 Eujuriniodes eva Townsend, 1935

References

Further reading

 
 
 
 

Tachinidae
Articles created by Qbugbot